Robert Brinley Joseph Harris  (born 11 April 1946), popularly known as "Whispering Bob" Harris, is an English music presenter known for being a host of the BBC2 music programme The Old Grey Whistle Test, and as a co-founder of the listings magazine Time Out. He currently presents Bob Harris Country on Thursdays on BBC Radio 2 at 9 pm.

Harris has been broadcasting on the BBC for 50 years and has been recognised with the Americana Music Association of America Trailblazer Award, a UK Heritage Award, and a MOJO Medal, as well as his OBE for services to broadcasting.

Early life
Born on 11 April 1946 in Northampton, Northamptonshire, England, Harris first followed in his father's footsteps and joined Northamptonshire Police as a cadet for two years. Harris's father was from Pontardawe in South Wales.

He then helped found Time Out magazine, as co-editor. Years later, he still refers to himself as "a journalist who can broadcast".

Career

The Old Grey Whistle Test
Harris also presented The Old Grey Whistle Test rock music show on BBC Two from 1972 until December 1979. His first appearance on the show was as chair of a debate on the Night Assemblies Bill, based on his experience as a journalist and at the invitation of producer Richard Williams. Shortly afterwards he was invited to be the main presenter. His velvety voice and quiet delivery earned him his enduring nickname. His hippie-style beard and laid-back presentation made him a favourite target for parody, most notably by Eric Idle on the 1970s BBC comedy show Rutland Weekend Television.

Harris later became notorious among the younger generation for distancing himself on air from Roxy Music's first performance on the show and deriding the New York Dolls as "mock rock". In the summer of 1974, Malcolm McLaren and Vivienne Westwood included Harris ("or the Sniffing Whistler as we know him") on a "Hates" list on their "You're going to wake up one morning and find out which side of the bed you've been lying on" T-shirt. In early 1977, at the Speakeasy (a London nightclub popular with rock stars of the day) Sex Pistols' fan and subsequent bass player Sid Vicious threatened Harris over whether the Pistols would appear on the Old Grey Whistle Test.

1980s
1981 saw Harris move to BBC Radio Oxford, presenting the weekday afternoon show 35 pm taking over from Timmy Mallett. He remained there until 1984. He then joined London's LBC Radio Station, presenting a weekly half-hour music review and also joined GWR, where he did shows on Saturday lunchtimes and Sunday afternoons.

From October 1984, Harris was heard on Norwich's Radio Broadland, presenting a Saturday evening show, and on a Sunday afternoon show on Hereward FM in Peterborough. At the same time he was still continuing with his half-hour music review on LBC and was recording shows for GWR. In 1986, he was offered the Weekend Nightline phone-in on LBC every Friday, Saturday, and Sunday 10 pm1 am, which he hosted until 1989. He was heard on BFBS from 1986 to 1998 and on the UK Independent Local Radio sustaining service, The Superstation.

Return to BBC Radio 1
Harris rejoined BBC Radio 1 in 1989, standing in for Richard Skinner for two weeks on the weekday 122 am slot, before being offered his own weekly show on Sunday nights from 11 pm to 2 am later that year following the death of Roger Scott. Harris then took over the weekday 122am slot from April 1990, which then became 124 am when Radio 1 started broadcasting 24 hours a day on 1 May 1991.

Move to BBC Radio London
In summer 1994, Harris moved to BBC Radio London, presenting a three-hour Saturday night show from 10pm to 1am, then additionally on Monday to Wednesday evenings from 8pm to midnight. He later left the Saturday night show to concentrate on BBC Radio London's Monday-Wednesday evening shows.

Return to national radio
In spring 1997, Harris returned to the national airwaves, this time on BBC Radio 2, where he took up an 11 pm1 am Saturday night slot. He still continued to present on GLR, but at this stage he quit the Monday to Wednesday evening shows and presented a Saturday afternoon show from 2 to 6 pm.

Harris eventually quit GLR in late 1998 as he took over another show for Radio 2, Bob Harris Country, (previously David Allan's Country Club) on Thursday evenings from 7 to 8pm, from 8 April 1999, and his Saturday night show then went out from 10pm to 1am. From April 2006, his Saturday show moved to an 11pm2am slot, and moved back another hour from 4 April 2010, meaning it aired early Sunday mornings from midnight to 3am. From October 2014 till January 2017, the show was on from 3 am to 6 am on Sundays. In February 2017, his Sunday show moved back to midnight to 3am. However, on 26 March 2017, Harris presented his last weekend Sunday early morning show on Radio 2 due to major changes to the weekend schedule. The final song played was When You Come To The End Of A Lollipop by Max Bygraves. Bob Harris Country continues on Thursdays currently 9pm.

On 9 January 2022, Harris started a weekly show on Boom Radio, sponsored by Find My Past, which explored how songs link together with other tracks. The hour long programme was broadcast on Sunday nights from 9pm and repeated on Wednesdays. The series ended its run on 27 February.

On 10 January 2022, Harris announced he was returning to the Sounds of the 70s programme after more than 50 years away by sitting in for Johnnie Walker on the episodes to be broadcast on BBC Radio 2 on the 16 and 23 January. He also sat in for Walker for 4 shows in January 2023. He currently presents Bob Harris Country on Thursdays on BBC Radio 2 at 9 pm.

Other work

In addition to his Radio 2 programmes, in 2002 Harris became an original presenter on the newly launched digital station BBC Radio 6 Music, presenting a Sunday-evening show from 5 to 8 pm. He left 6 Music in 2004. He soon went on to present a new show on Radio 2 which broadcast on Friday nights/Saturday mornings from midnight to 3 am. He was replaced in this slot by Mark Lamarr, but returned to it temporarily, when Lamarr left the BBC at the end of 2010. The end of the Friday show has allowed Harris to concentrate more on producing one-off shows such as the Maple Leaf Revolution under the auspices of the Whispering Bob Broadcasting Company.

He was the subject of This Is Your Life in 2003 when he was surprised by Michael Aspel at BBC Broadcasting House.

Harris was heard covering for Chris Evans on Radio 2 drivetime over the festive holiday 200708 and 200809.

Harris has presented the C2C: Country to Country festival live from The O2 Arena in London every year since its inception in 2013 and simultaneously broadcasts over BBC Radio 2 Country which was first established in 2015, the same year when Harris was given his own stage to present at the festival. This stage, the Under the Apple Tree stage, formed the basis for his own Under the Apple Tree festival which will first take place in 2016.

Harris has been credited by John Thomson as the inspiration for his The Fast Show character Louis Balfour, who comperes "Jazz Club" and whose softly spoken delivery echoes Harris' "unshakeable enthusiasm" on The Old Grey Whistle Test.

In 2018 Harris made a cameo appearance in Tom Harper's country music drama film Wild Rose.

In 2018 Harris joined 26 other celebrities at Metropolis Studios, to perform the original Christmas song "Rock With Rudolph", written and produced by Grahame and Jack Corbyn. The song was created in aid of Great Ormond Street Hospital and was released digitally on independent record label Saga Entertainment on 30 November 2018. The music video debuted exclusively with The Sun on 29 November 2018 and had its first TV showing on Good Morning Britain on 30 November 2018. The song peaked at number two on the iTunes pop chart.

Personal life
Harris has eight children and six granddaughters. Harris married Trudie Myerscough who is also his manager, in 1991. She is the mother of his three youngest children. Harris lives in Steventon, Oxfordshire.

In 2007, Harris was diagnosed with prostate cancer, for which he was treated with hormone therapy and radiotherapy.

In May 2019 it was announced that Harris would take a break from his BBC Radio 2 presenting for a while, after suffering an aortic dissection (having undergone a tear to his aorta while walking 10 days previously). He returned to Radio 2 on 19 September 2019.

Awards
Honorary Fellowship from the School of the Arts, Northampton University.
Sony Radio Academy Awards 2009 – Silver for The Sandy Denny Story: Who Knows Where The Time Goes
Sony Radio Academy Awards 2008 – Silver for The Day John Met Paul
CMA International Broadcaster of the Year 2004.
 2011 Mojo Medal
 Harris was awarded the Trailblazer Award by the Americana Music Association in 2011.
Harris was appointed Officer of the British Empire (OBE) in the 2011 Birthday Honours for services to music broadcasting.
On the red carpet of the 2012 CMA awards, Harris was awarded the CMA Wesley Rose International Media Achievement Award by Little Big Town.
In 2013, Harris won his second CMA International Broadcaster of the Year Award.
On the last day of the 2016 Country to Country festival, Harris was awarded his second CMA Wesley Rose International Media Achievement Award by Kacey Musgraves.
On Day 2 of C2C 2017, Kristian Bush surprised Harris with the CMA International Broadcaster of the Year Award.

Books

References

External links

Official archive website
The Country Show with Bob Harris (BBC Radio 2)
The Whispering Bob Broadcasting Company

Living people
1946 births
BBC Radio 1 presenters
BBC Radio 2 presenters
BBC Radio 6 Music presenters
BBC television presenters
English male journalists
English people of Welsh descent
English radio DJs
English television presenters
Officers of the Order of the British Empire
People from Northampton
Record collectors